The 2018 Canberra Tennis International was a professional tennis tournament played on outdoor hard courts. It was the fourth edition of the tournament and was part of the 2018 ATP Challenger Tour and the 2018 ITF Women's Circuit. It took place in Canberra, Australia, on 29 October–4 November 2018.

Men's singles main draw entrants

Seeds 

 1 Rankings as of 22 October 2018.

Other entrants 
The following players received a wildcard into the singles main draw:
  Jeremy Beale
  Jacob Grills
  Luke Saville
  Aleksandar Vukic

The following players received entry from the qualifying draw:
  Thomas Fancutt
  Brydan Klein
  Rubin Statham
  Francesco Vilardo

The following player received entry as a lucky loser:
  Wu Tung-lin

Women's singles main draw entrants

Seeds 

 1 Rankings as of 22 October 2018.

Other entrants 
The following players received a wildcard into the singles main draw:
  Alexandra Bozovic
  Seone Mendez
  Alana Parnaby
  Olivia Tjandramulia

The following players received entry from the qualifying draw:
  Jodie Anna Burrage
  Maddison Inglis
  Irina Ramialison
  Zuzana Zlochová

Champions

Men's singles

 Jordan Thompson def.  Nicola Kuhn 6–1, 5–7, 6–4.

Women's singles

 Zoe Hives def.  Olivia Rogowska, 6–4, 6–2

Men's doubles

 Evan Hoyt /  Wu Tung-lin def.  Jeremy Beale /  Thomas Fancutt 7–6(7–5), 5–7, [10–8].

Women's doubles

 Ellen Perez /  Arina Rodionova def.  Destanee Aiava /  Naiktha Bains, 6–7(5–7), 6–3, [10–7]

External links 
 2018 Canberra Tennis International at ITFtennis.com
 Official website

2018 ITF Women's Circuit
2018 ATP Challenger Tour
2018 in Australian tennis
2018